The 1971 World Table Tennis Championships men's singles was the 31st edition of the men's singles championship. 

Stellan Bengtsson defeated Shigeo Itoh in the final, winning three sets to one to secure the title.

Results

See also
List of World Table Tennis Championships medalists

References

-